Luigi Ferraris (18 November 1887 – 23 August 1915) was an Italian footballer, engineer and soldier who died during World War I.

Biography
Ferraris was born Florence, while his family hailed from Saluzzo, Piedmont. He joined Genoa in 1902, and played there his entire career, where he won the reserve championship (it) 4–0 against Juventus in 1904.

He studied engineering at the Polytechnic University of Milan from 1906 to 1911. Afterwards, he worked at the Officine Elettriche Genovesi (OEG) in San Fruttuoso, then at Pirelli in Milan.

During the World War I, he served as a volunteer then reached the rank of lieutenant. He was awarded the Medal of Military Valor in 1915.

In 1933, the stadium, Stadio Luigi Ferraris, was named after him.

References

1887 births
1915 deaths
Footballers from Florence
Polytechnic University of Milan alumni
Genoa C.F.C. players
Engineers from Florence
Italian military personnel killed in World War I
Recipients of the Silver Medal of Military Valor
20th-century Italian engineers
Italian footballers
Association football midfielders